Óengus mac Mugróin (died 803) was a king of the Uí Failge, a Laigin people of County Offaly. He was the son of Mugrón mac Flainn (died 782), a previous king. He ruled from 783 to 803.

A conflict within the Uí Failge led to a slaughter in 789 at Cluain Ferta Mongáin (Kilclonfert, County Offaly) by Óengus at which his cousin Áed mac Tomaltaig was slain (their fathers were brothers). In 803 he was treacherously killed by the followers of Fínsnechta Cethardec mac Cellaig (died 808), over king of Leinster. Finsnechta was ensuring his control of the church of Kildare which led to conflict with the Uí Failge.

His grandson Máel Sinchill mac Mugróin (died 881) was a King of the Uí Failge.

Notes

See also
 Kings of Ui Failghe

References

 Byrne, Francis John (2001), Irish Kings and High-Kings, Dublin: Four Courts Press, 
 Mac Niocaill, Gearoid (1972), Ireland before the Vikings, Dublin: Gill and Macmillan
 Ó Cróinín, Dáibhí (2005), A New History of Ireland, Volume One, Oxford: Oxford University Press

External links
CELT: Corpus of Electronic Texts at University College Cork

803 deaths
8th-century Irish monarchs
9th-century Irish monarchs
Year of birth unknown